The Mpumalanga Provincial Legislature (MPL), previously known as the Eastern Transvaal Legislature, is the primary legislative body of the South African province of Mpumalanga.
 
The First Legislature was inaugurated in May 1994 as the Eastern Transvaal Legislature. It was renamed in 1995.

The Provincial Legislature, along with the other provincial legislatures of South Africa, exists by virtue of Chapter 6 of the Constitution of South Africa. It is unicameral, and consists of 30 members elected by a system of party-list proportional representation.

The Sixth Provincial Legislature was elected on 8 May 2019 in South Africa's 2019 general elections. A majority of the members belong to the African National Congress.

Powers
The Mpumalanga Provincial Legislature elects the Premier of Mpumalanga. The legislature can force the Premier to resign by passing a motion of no confidence. Although the Executive Council is appointed by the Premier of Mpumalanga, the legislature may pass a motion of no confidence to compel the Premier to reorient the Council. The legislature also appoints Mpumalanga's delegates to the National Council of Provinces, allocating delegates to parties in proportion to the number of seats each party holds in the legislature.

The legislature has the power to pass legislation in various fields mentioned in the national constitution; in some fields the legislative power is shared with the national parliament, while in others it is reserved to Mpumalanga alone. The fields include such matters as health, education, agriculture, housing, environmental protection, and development planning.

The legislature oversees the administration of the provincial government, and the Premier and the members of the Executive Council are required to report to the legislature on the performance of their responsibilities. The legislature also manages the fiscal matters of the provincial government by way of the appropriation bills which determine the provincial budget.

Election
The Provincial Legislature consists of 30 members, who are elected through a system of party list proportional representation with closed lists. In other words, each voter casts a vote for one political party, and seats in the legislature are allocated to the parties in proportion to the number of votes received. The seats are then filled by members in accordance with lists submitted by the parties before the election.

The Legislature is elected for a term of five years unless it is dissolved early. This may occur if the legislature votes to dissolve and it is at least three years since the last election, or if the Premiership falls vacant and the legislature fails to elect a new Premier within ninety days. By convention, all nine provincial legislatures and the National Assembly are elected on the same day.

The most recent election was held on 8 May 2019. The following table summarises the results.

The following table shows the composition of the provincial parliament after past elections.

Presiding Officers

Each of the nine provincial legislatures has Presiding Officers. The Presiding Officers can be the Speaker, Deputy Speaker, Chairperson of Committees and the Deputy Chairperson of Committees. The following people have served as the Speaker:

Members

References

External links
 Official website

Legislature
Provincial legislatures of South Africa
Unicameral legislatures